is a Japanese male volleyball player. He is part of the Japan men's national volleyball team. On club level he plays for Toray Arrows.

Personal life 

His family consising of father, Kazuhiko Takahashi, used to play Baseball. His mother, older sister and a younger sister, who is a Long jump athlete.

Career 
Kentaro used to play Baseball before and he aimed to be professional baseball player. But at 15 years old, he broke his elbow so he had to quit playing baseball. After that, he attended at Yonezawa Chuo High School, he started to play volleyball and had an initiation about his future career as a volleyball player.

In 2012, He had selected as a Japan men's national under-19 volleyball team for the first time and received the bronze medal from the 2012 Asian Youth Boys Volleyball Championship.

In 2014, Kentaro had registered in Japan men's national volleyball team for the first time and entered University of Tsukuba respectively. Then, he was dubbed by the then national team coach Masashi Nanbu as one of "NEXT4", the word that referred to 4 players who would be the future of Japanese men's national team, alongside Masahiro Yanagida, Yūki Ishikawa and Akihiro Yamauchi.

In 2016, Kentaro decided to join Toray Arrows volleyball club in V.League and started playing for the team in 2016-17 season.

Ahead of 2022 FIVB Volleyball Men's World Championship, he quit national team for family matter.

Individual Award
 2021-2022 V.League Division 1 -  Best Blocker
 2021-2022 V.League Division 1 -  Best 6
 2021-2022 V.League Division 1 -  Fair Play Award

References

External links
 
 profile at FIVB.org
 「勘違いしちゃったんでしょうね」バレー・高橋健太郎が過去告白 at ananweb.jp
 昔は甲子園を目指したバレー選手。 高橋健太郎を変えたひと言とは。 at number.bunshun.jp

1995 births
Living people
Japanese men's volleyball players
Place of birth missing (living people)
Sportspeople from Yamagata Prefecture
University of Tsukuba alumni
21st-century Japanese people